Sheffield Steel is the eighth studio album by Joe Cocker, produced by Chris Blackwell and Alex Sadkin, with Sly and Robbie, Wally Badarou, Barry Reynolds, Mikey Chung and Uziah "Sticky" Thompson, a.k.a. the Compass Point Allstars, a studio band named after the legendary Compass Point Studios, Nassau, Bahamas, and released in 1982. This was Cocker's first album for Island Records and followed a four-year break in recording for the singer following his previous album, Luxury You Can Afford. It was re-released in 2002 with several bonus tracks.

Track listing
 "Look What You've Done" (Leo Nocentelli) - 4:14
 "Shocked" (Ira Ingber, Gregg Sutton) - 3:13
 "Sweet Little Woman" (Andy Fraser) - 4:01
 "Seven Days" (Bob Dylan) - 5:23
 "Marie" (Randy Newman) - 2:34
 "Ruby Lee" (Bill Withers, Melvin Dunlap) - 4:24
 "Many Rivers to Cross" (Jimmy Cliff) - 3:43
 "So Good, So Right" (Brenda Russell) - 2:33
 "Talking Back to the Night" (Steve Winwood, Will Jennings) - 4:49
 "Just Like Always" (Jimmy Webb) - 3:25

Bonus tracks
 "Sweet Little Woman" (Andy Fraser) [12" mix] - 5:59
 "Look What You've Done" (Leo Nocentelli) [12" mix] - 8:40
 "Right in the Middle (Of Falling in Love)" (Sam Dees) - 3:48
 "Inner City Blues" (Marvin Gaye, James Nyx Jr.) - 5:20

Personnel 
 Joe Cocker – lead vocals
 Wally Badarou – keyboards
 Mikey Chung – guitars (1, 2, 4-10)
 Barry Reynolds – guitars (1, 2, 4-10), backing vocals (8)
 Adrian Belew – guitars (3)
 Robbie Shakespeare – bass, backing vocals (3)
 Sly Dunbar – drums
 Uziah Thompson – percussion
 Jimmy Cliff – backing vocals (3)
 Robert Palmer – backing vocals (8)

Production 
 Chris Blackwell – producer
 Alex Sadkin – producer, engineer
 Paul Wexler – production associate
 Benjamin Armbrister – engineer
 Ted Jensen – mastering at Sterling Sound (New York City, NY).
 David Oxtoby – cover painting
 Lynn Goldsmith – photography

Chart performance

Certifications

References

Joe Cocker albums
1982 albums
Albums produced by Alex Sadkin
Albums produced by Chris Blackwell
Island Records albums
Bahamian music